Augusto Sérgio Ferreira (born 7 September 1965), known as Guto Ferreira, is a Brazilian professional football coach in charge of Goiás.

Career
Born in Piracicaba, São Paulo, Ferreira began his career with hometown side XV de Piracicaba. After a quick spell at Guarani as a performance analyst, he joined São Paulo's youth sides in 1995.

In 2000, after spending three years with the youth teams, Ferreira was named assistant coach of Internacional; in 2002, he was named interim after the dismissal of Ivo Wortmann. He won that year's Campeonato Gaúcho and was permanently appointed as head coach on 4 June 2002, but was still sacked on 26 August.

On 15 May 2003, Ferreira was appointed head coach of Noroeste. The following 17 August he moved abroad, joining Segunda Liga side F.C. Penafiel.

On 4 February 2004, Ferreira was dismissed. He was appointed at the helm of Associação Naval 1º de Maio on 4 March, but was relieved of his duties on 12 September.

In 2005 Ferreira returned to Brazil, being appointed at Corinthians Alagoano. After a spell at 15 de Novembro-RS, he returned to Internacional in 2008, again as an assistant; he was also an interim in June 2008, after the departure of Abel Braga.

In the following two years, Ferreira managed Mogi Mirim (two stints), Criciúma and ABC. On 24 September 2012, he was appointed head coach of Ponte Preta.

Ferreira was dismissed on 6 June 2013, and on 28 July he was named Portuguesa head coach, with the side seriously threatened with relegation. He managed to finish 12th with the club, but the side ultimately suffered relegation due to irregularly fielding in a player; in the following February, he resigned.

On 24 July 2014, immediately after leaving Figueirense, Ferreira returned to Ponte. He was sacked on 3 August 2015, and was appointed head coach of Chapecoense on 14 September.

On 24 June 2016, Ferreira left Chape after agreeing to a deal with Bahia. He left the club in the same manner the following 30 May, after returning to Inter, now in the first team.

On 11 November 2017, after a 1–1 draw against Vila Nova and thus losing the leadership of 2017 Campeonato Brasileiro Série B, Ferreira was relieved from his duties. On 26 December, he returned to Bahia, but was sacked the following 3 June.

On 7 August 2018, Ferreira was appointed head coach of Chape for the second time, but was dismissed on 15 October. On 20 February of the following year, he took over Sport Recife, helping in their promotion to the first division at the end of the season but being dismissed on 13 February 2020 after a poor start of the campaign.

On 18 March 2020, Ferreira was named Ceará head coach in the place of Enderson Moreira. He was sacked by the club on 29 August of the following year, after nearly 100 matches in charge.

On 6 October 2021, Ferreira returned to Bahia for a third spell, replacing Diego Dabove. He was kept in charge of the club despite their relegation, but was dismissed on 26 June 2022.

On 16 August 2022, Ferreira returned to the top tier after being announced as head coach of Coritiba. On 9 December, despite avoiding relegation, he was sacked, and was announced in charge of fellow top tier side Goiás the following day.

Coaching statistics

Honours
Internacional
 Campeonato Gaúcho: 2002
 Copa São Paulo de Futebol Júnior: 1998

Chapecoense
 Campeonato Catarinense: 2016

Bahia
 Copa do Nordeste: 2017
 Campeonato Baiano: 2018

Sport
 Campeonato Pernambucano: 2019

Ceará
 Copa do Nordeste: 2020

References

External links

1965 births
Living people
People from Piracicaba
Brazilian football managers
Campeonato Brasileiro Série A managers
Campeonato Brasileiro Série B managers
Liga Portugal 2 managers
Copa do Nordeste winning managers
Esporte Clube XV de Novembro (Piracicaba) managers
São Paulo FC managers
Esporte Clube Noroeste managers
Sport Club Internacional managers
F.C. Penafiel managers
Associação Naval 1º de Maio managers
Sport Club Corinthians Alagoano managers
Clube 15 de Novembro managers
Mogi Mirim Esporte Clube managers
Criciúma Esporte Clube managers
ABC Futebol Clube managers
Associação Atlética Ponte Preta managers
Associação Portuguesa de Desportos managers
Figueirense FC managers
Associação Chapecoense de Futebol managers
Esporte Clube Bahia managers
Sport Club do Recife managers
Ceará Sporting Club managers
Coritiba Foot Ball Club managers
Goiás Esporte Clube managers